Trevor Chadwick (22April 190723December 1979) was one of the people, mostly British, who oversaw the operation of the Kindertransport to rescue Jewish and other refugee children in Czechoslovakia in 1938–1939 before World War II. Nazi Germany annexed part of Czechoslovakia in 1938 and occupied nearly the whole country in 1939. The children were mostly resettled with families in Great Britain.

Early life
Chadwick was born on 22 April 1907. He attended Oxford University where he was the captain of a rugby team and graduated in 1928 with a third in jurisprudence. His family and friends believed he should have done better. He was a troublesome youth and had a fondness for alcohol. After graduation, he joined the Colonial Service and worked in Nigeria for 18 months. He became a Latin teacher at his family's school in Swanage, Dorset and married in 1931.  He was regarded as kind and considerate of others, but unruly and unconventional in his personal life. Chadwick was described by the poet Gerda Mayer, one of the Jewish children he sent to Britain, as tall and handsome, casual and self-assured.

Chadwick and the kindertransport
In January 1939, Chadwick journeyed to Czechoslovakia to accompany two refugee children back to Britain where they had been admitted to his school. He met another refugee child,  Gerda Mayer, in Prague, interviewed her and her family, and took her along with the other two children. Chadwick's mother sponsored Mayer, putting up the guarantee of 50 pounds which was required for the permission to admit refugee children to Britain. Chadwick described his initial reaction to the situation in Prague: "We got a clear impression of the enormity of the task. We so often saw halls of confused refugees and batches of lost children, mostly Jewish, and we saw only the fringe of it all."   

After delivering the first three children to Britain, Chadwick returned to Czechoslovakia to help rescue more children. Thousands were on a list for possible rescue, but he could only save hundreds. Working with the British Committee for Refugees from Czechoslovakia headed by Doreen Warriner, he had the task of selecting children for the kindertransport and organizing their departure. His first operation was an evacuation by a 20-seat airplane from Prague. Later evacuation of children was usually by train. Chadwick accompanied the children to the Prague Railroad Station. From Prague the children, with adult escorts, journeyed by rail through Poland to a seaport on the Baltic Sea from where they sailed to Britain. In Britain, Nicholas Winton worked to get permissions for the children to be granted entry.
 

On 15 March 1939, the situation in Czechoslovakia became more dangerous. German troops took control of the whole country. The German crackdown stimulated a large market in forged passports and exit documents in which Chadwick was probably involved. Warriner and many other refugee workers found it prudent to leave the country and in early June 1939, Chadwick saw off a final trainload of 123 children and left Czechoslovakia. With his departure, Beatrice Wellington became head of the British Committee and the evacuation of children continued. All together, until it was shut down with the beginning of World War II on 1 September 1939, the kindertransport escorted 669 children out of Czechoslovakia.                    

Winton, who was honored many years later for his participation in the kindertransport, acknowledged the vital roles in Prague of Chadwick, along with Doreen Warriner, diplomat Robert J. Stopford, Beatrice Wellington, Josephine Pike, and Bill Barazetti.  Of Chadwick, Winton later wrote, "Chadwick did the more difficult and dangerous work after the Nazis invaded... he deserves all praise".

Later life
Chadwick's life took a downward trajectory after Czechoslovakia. He joined first the Royal Naval Reserve and later the Royal Air Force but after several incidents, probably caused by his excessive drinking, was sent back to Britain from North Africa in 1942. He divorced his first wife and married again briefly. He worked at a number of jobs, but was diagnosed with tuberculosis and sent by his family to a sanitarium in Oslo, Norway. He married for a third time there and apparently achieved some happiness and stability, but suffered a stroke and died on 23 December 1979. At the time of his death the work of the Czechoslovakian refugee workers was largely forgotten, but the lionization of Nicholas Winton beginning in 1988 brought some recognition to members of the group.

Legacy
Chadwick is now commemorated in his home town of Swanage, Dorset with a children's playground named after him in the Recreation Ground. A bronze sculpture of Chadwick with two children by local sculptor Moira Purver has been designed and will shortly (2021) be cast and then installed in the recreation ground.  Swanage Town Council has approved (2020) the installation of a blue plaque commemorating Chadwick at Swanage railway station. The statue was erected on 29 August 2022.

References 

1907 births
1979 deaths
British humanitarians
Kindertransport
20th-century British people
People from Swanage